Joseph Montague "Joe" Barbuto (born August 15, 1983 in Rock Springs, Wyoming) is Sweetwater County Treasurer, Chair of the Wyoming Democratic Party, and a Democratic former member of the Wyoming State Legislature, representing House District 48 in the 59th through 61st Wyoming Legislatures.

Barbuto first ran for house district 48 in 2008, defeating opponent Tony Herrera. Barbuto went on to win the general election unopposed. Upon the resignation of then Representative Marty Martin, who was appointed to fill the unexpired term of state Senator Rae Lynn Job, Barbuto was appointed early to his position and served briefly in the 59th Wyoming State Legislature. His elected term in the 60th Wyoming Legislature began in January 2009. In 2010, Barbuto ran for reelection unopposed. During the 61st legislature, he was elected to serve as the House Minority Caucus Chairman.

Barbuto was named legislator of the year in 2010 and 2011 by the Wyoming Highway Patrol Association.

In 2017, Barbuto was elected as Chair of the Wyoming Democratic Party. He was unanimously reelected in 2019 and 2021. Per changes to state party bylaws, starting in 2021, the term of the state chair will be four years.

In July 2021, Barbuto was selected by the Sweetwater County Board of Commissioners to fill the unexpired term of County Treasurer Robb Slaughter. Barbuto was sworn in and began serving in this position on July 21, 2021.

Barbuto and his wife, Erin, live in Rock Springs, Wyoming, where she works as an educator and social worker.

References

External links
Official webpage at the Wyoming Legislature
 

1983 births
Living people
Democratic Party members of the Wyoming House of Representatives
People from Rock Springs, Wyoming
University of Wyoming alumni
State political party chairs of Wyoming